The Voroshilov Sharpshooter (translit. Voroshilovskiy strelok, named after a badge for markmanship) is a 1999 Russian vigilante drama film directed by Stanislav Govorukhin based on the book Woman on Wednesdays ( translit. Zhenshchina po sredam) by Viktor Pronin. The concept loosely resembles the rape and revenge genre. The film became successful with numerous awards given for the film including the prestigious Russian Guild of Film Critics 1999 for best actor by Mikhail Ulyanov. It also has 1 win and 3 nominations for Nika Awards.

Plot
In the summer of 1999, a decorated World War II veteran, Ivan Afonin, lives with his granddaughter Katya. In a nearby flat, three bored youths, Vadim Pashutin, local businessman Boris Chukhanov and student Igor Zvorygin, kill time by designating Wednesdays as a day of sexual gratification and hiring a prostitute. On this particular Wednesday, they fail to acquire one, and decide to resort to a random female passerby instead. They lure Katya to their flat under the pretense of "a birthday party" and rape her. Initially, the offenders are arrested; however, Vadim's father Nikolai is a senior figure in the police and uses his influence to have the charges against his son and his friends dropped.

Frustrated at the offenders having escaped justice, Ivan sells his dacha for $5000 and uses the money to purchase a SVD sniper rifle equipped with a silencer from an illegal weapons trader. While testing his purchase in the presence of the seller, he hits all the test targets perfectly, making the seller call him "a true Voroshilov Sharpshooter" in admiration.

When a female neighbour goes on a trip, she leaves Ivan the keys to her flat so he can look after her parrot. Ivan tours the flat and discovers that it is situated directly in front of and overlooks the offenders’ flat. From there, he begins to administer vigilante justice. Taking care not to kill the offenders, he instead cripples them. First, he shoots Zvorygin's genitals through a bottle of sparkling wine. Secondly, he causes Chukhanov's brand new car to explode, by shooting the gas tank: although Chukhanov survives, the lower half of his body is severely burnt.

Nikolai figures out that Ivan must be behind both accidents, ordering the search of Ivan's house and the second flat. However, police find nothing (Alexei, the local police watcher, had found and hid the rifle in his own house a day before that). Still, Nikolai threatens Ivan, saying that should anything happen to his son, he will face severe consequences. Ivan interrupts him, saying that something has already happened (meaning that Vadim becoming a rapist clearly shows something has happened to him). Nikolai, however, takes his words literally, and rushes home, shooting out the door lock to open it (not knowing a paranoid Vadim has barricaded the door). Following the shot, Vadim shoots back through the door with a shotgun, wounding his father and, after days of fright, losing his sanity.

In the epilogue Alexei tells Ivan of the hidden rifle and unofficially confiscates it, and at home Katya sings again, signaling her recovery and the return of domestic harmony, which moves Ivan to tears.

Cast
  Mikhail Ulyanov  as Ivan Fyodorovich Afonin, pensioner
  Anna Sinyakina  as Katya Afonina, Ivan Fyodorovich's granddaughter
  Aleksandr Porokhovshchikov  as  Nikolai Petrovich Pashutin, police colonel, Vadim's father 
  Vladislav Galkin as  Alexei  Podberyozkin, local policeman
 Irina Rozanova as  Olga Ivanovna Afonina, Katya's mother 
  Ilya Drevnov  as  Vadim Pashutin 
Alexei Makarov  as  Boris Chukhanov 
  Marat Basharov as  Igor Zvorygin 
 Karen Muradyan as David «Dodik», colleague and roommate of Olga
 Sergei Aprelsky as gun seller #1
 Aleksey Shevchenkov as gun seller #2
 Oleg Komarov as gun dealer
  Sergei Garmash  as  police captain Kashaev 
 Vitaly Logvinovsky as domino player 
  Vladimir Semago  as  investigator Shevelyov
  Georgy Martirosyan  as  prosecutor

Production
Anna Sinyakina claimed to have been replaced by a body double in the rape scene.

Differences from the book 
For Ivan's first strike, he shoots the student's genitals. This diverges from the book where he shoots him in the leg.

Reactions
The film proved controversial, for its graphic and violent features with some film critics describing it as  a call to violence.

Several subsequent real life cases of vigilante justice have been compared to the film.

See also
The Virgin Spring
The Last House on the Left (1972 film)
Death Wish (1974 film)
I Spit on Your Grave
Sudden Impact 
Rape and revenge film

References

External links
The Voroshilov Sharpshooter at IMDB.com

1999 films
Russian crime drama films
1990s Russian-language films
Rape and revenge films
Films directed by Stanislav Govorukhin
1990s crime drama films
1999 drama films